Vachellia aroma is a small, perennial, thorny tree native to Peru, Chile, Argentina and Paraguay. It is not listed as being a threatened species. Although some sources say that Vachellia macracantha is synonymous with Vachellia aroma, genetic analysis of the two species has shown that they are different, but that they are closely related.

Uses 
Vachellia aroma is used by bees to make honey.  The tree's wood is quite hard and it is used for implements, posts and firewood.

Botanical varieties 
Vachellia aroma var. aroma
Vachellia aroma var. huarango

References

External links 

Vachellia aroma branch with blossoms (www.fieldmuseum.org)
Vachellia aroma branch with pods (www.fieldmuseum.org)

aroma
Trees of Argentina
Trees of Bolivia
Trees of Paraguay
Trees of Peru